The First Step may refer to:

Music
The First Step (Faces album), or First Step, 1971
Four releases by Treasure:
The First Step: Chapter One, single album, 2020
The First Step: Chapter Two, single album, 2020
The First Step: Chapter Three, single album, 2020
The First Step: Treasure Effect, studio album, 2021
"The First Step" (song), by Tracy Byrd, 1994

Other uses
The First Step (essay), an 1891 essay by Leo Tolstoy
The First Step (film), a 2021 American documentary film

See also 
First Step (disambiguation)